The urogenital sinus is a part of the human body only present in the development of the urinary and reproductive organs.  It is the ventral part of the cloaca, formed after the cloaca separates from the anal canal during the fourth to seventh weeks of development.

In males, the UG sinus is divided into three regions: upper, pelvic, and phallic.   The upper part gives rise to the urinary bladder and the pelvic part gives rise to the prostatic and membranous parts of the urethra, the prostate and the bulbourethral gland (Cowper's). The phallic portion gives rise to the spongy (bulbar) part of the urethra and the urethral glands (Littre's). Note that the penile part of the urethra originates from urogenital fold.

In females, the pelvic part of the UG sinus gives rise to the sinovaginal bulbs, structures that will eventually form the inferior two thirds of the vagina.  This process begins when the lower tip of the paramesonephric ducts, the structures that will eventually form the uterus and vaginal fornices, come in contact with the UG sinus.  Shortly afterwards, the sinovaginal bulbs form as two solid evaginations of the UG sinus. Cells in these bulbs divide to form a solid vaginal plate, which extends and then canalizes (hollows) to form the inferior portion of the vagina. The female urogenital sinus also gives rise to the urethra and vestibule of the vagina.

Clinical significance
A urogenital sinus anomaly is also a rare birth defect in women where the urethra and vagina both open into a common channel.

A persistent cloaca is a disorder where the rectum, vagina, and urinary tract meet and fuse, creating a cloaca, a single common channel.

Other animals
In most mammals (excluding primates and species that have a cloaca), the urogenital sinus refers to the sinus in which the openings to the female's urethra and vagina are found.  The urogenital sinus of non-primates is homologous to the vulval vestibule of primates.

Additional images

See also
Genitography

References

http://www.embryology.ch/anglais/ugenital/genitinterne04.html
https://www.amboss.com/us/knowledge/Development_of_the_reproductive_system

External links
 Urologyhealth.org page on Urogenital Sinus anomalies
 Fetal pig dissection
 Embryology.ch
 AMBOSS

Embryology of urogenital system